Pablo Santos may refer to:
 Pablo Santos (actor) (1987–2006), Mexican actor
 Pablo Santos (tennis) (born 1984), Spanish tennis player
 Pablo Fernández Santos (born 1976), Spanish politician
 Pablo Santos (footballer) (born 1992), Brazilian footballer
 Pablo Santos (born 1994), Brazilian writer